"To the Moon and Back" is a song by Australian pop duo Savage Garden. It was released in Australia on 4 November 1996 as the second single from their self-titled 1997 album. It was the follow up to their hit "I Want You". It won the 1997 ARIA Music Award for Song of the Year. The song became the band's first number-one single in their native country, reached number three on the UK Singles Chart, and peaked at number 24 on the US Billboard Hot 100.

Background
In an interview with Apple Music about their debut album, singer Darren Hayes explained the origins of the song.

Release and chart performances

After the international success of their debut single, "I Want You", there were high expectations for the song as its follow-up. During the song's first charting in the US after its release there in July 1997, the song entered the top 40 of the Billboard Hot 100 for only one week, peaking at number 37 the final week of August 1997. In the United Kingdom, the single was originally released in September 1997, and there it failed to chart in the top 40, stalling at number 55 for one week.

Subsequently, "Truly Madly Deeply" became an international hit, reaching number one on several music charts, including the Billboard Hot 100 and the Adult Contemporary charts, where it broke the record as the longest-running single to that time on the Adult Contemporary charts. While the song did not initially experience success in the US, the success of "Truly Madly Deeply" inspired Savage Garden and Columbia Records to remix "To the Moon and Back" in 1998 and release it again.

In the wake of such success, the band decided the song had greater potential to become a hit than its first chartings had borne out, and so instead of mining a fourth single from the album as they had for the Australian market, they decided to mix a shorter edit of "To the Moon and Back" and re-release it internationally in 1998. This time the song peaked at number 24 in the US. In the UK, the single debuted at number three, becoming Savage Garden's biggest hit in the country. This prompted the re-release of their debut single, remixed as "I Want You '98".

Critical reception
Larry Flick from Billboard wrote, "The follow-up to the platinum-selling "I Want You" should keep the momentum of this charming Australian duo building quite nicely. Wisely, this track doesn't attempt to mimic the quirky, almost novelty-driven sound of its predecessor. Instead, it affirms partners Darren Hayes and Daniel Jones' talent for crafting immediately catchy hooks and solid, sing-along choruses. Once again, the music warmly revisits the new-romantic sound of the '80s with its melodramatic blend of satiny synths and jittery guitars." A reviewer from Music Week rated the song three out of five, saying that it is not as hook-driven as "I Want You", "but it's still commercial enough to win over ILR and clinch a Top 30 place."

Music videos
There have been three different music videos for the song. The first, accompanying the Australian release of the song, was directed by Catherine Caines and Chris Bentley, and was shot in black and white. This version features Hayes and Jones performing on what appears to be a space vessel, whilst a female passenger watches. A version of the video accompanied by a dance remix of the track was also released.

The second, accompanying the United States and original United Kingdom release of the song, was directed by Nigel Dick, and features Darren and Daniel performing in an apartment in Malibu whilst a female records the performance. It was filmed between April 17 and 18, 1997. This American video features Hayes with long hair.

The third version was filmed in New York, and features a sad-looking teenage girl traveling by the metro to meet her friends (apparently other misfits like herself). This video features Hayes with short hair, and is the most well-known of the three versions.

Track listings

Australia
 CD and cassette single
 "To the Moon and Back" (radio edit)
 "Santa Monica"
 "Memories Are Designed to Fade"
 "To the Moon and Back" (album version)

United Kingdom
 CD1 (1997)
 "To the Moon and Back" (short edit) – 4:13
 "To the Moon and Back" (album version) – 5:42
 "To the Moon and Back" (Hani's Num club mix) – 9:18
 "Memories Are Designed to Fade" – 3:39

 CD2 (1997)
 "To the Moon and Back" (album version) – 5:42
 "To the Moon and Back" (Hani's Num radio edit) – 3:57
 "To the Moon and Back" (Escape into Hyperspace) – 4:39
 "All Around Me" – 4:11

 Cassette single (1997)
 "To the Moon and Back" (album version) – 5:42
 "Memories Are Designed to Fade" – 3:39

 CD1 (1998)
 "To the Moon and Back" (album version) – 5:42
 "To the Moon and Back" (Almighty radio edit) – 4:05
 "Truly Madly Deeply" (karaoke version) – 4:38

 CD2 (1998)
 "To the Moon and Back" (radio edit) – 3:44
 "To the Moon and Back" (Almighty Fired Up mix) – 6:16
 "To the Moon and Back" (Almighty Definitive mix) – 6:09

 Cassette single (1998)
 "To the Moon and Back" (album version) – 5:42
 "To the Moon and Back" (Almighty radio edit) – 3:44

Europe
 CD1 (1997)
 "To the Moon and Back" (short edit) – 4:13
 "Memories Are Designed to Fade" – 3:39

 CD2 (1997)
 "To the Moon and Back" (short edit) – 4:13
 "To the Moon and Back" – 5:41
 "To the Moon and Back" (Hani's Num radio edit) – 3:57
 "To the Moon and Back" (Escape into Hyper Space) – 4:39
 "Memories Are Designed to Fade" – 3:39

 CD1 (1998)
 "To the Moon and Back" (radio edit) – 3:42
 "To the Moon and Back" (The Almighty 7-inch mix) – 3:48

 CD2 (1997)
 "To the Moon and Back" (radio edit) – 3:42
 "To the Moon and Back" (The Almighty 7-inch mix) – 3:48
 "To the Moon and Back" (Almighty Fired Up mix) – 6:16
 "To the Moon and Back" (Almighty Definitive mix) – 6:09

United States
 CD and cassette single (1997)
 "To the Moon and Back" (long edit) – 4:32
 "Memories Are Designed to Fade" – 3:39

Japan
 CD single
 "To the Moon and Back"
 "To the Moon and Back" (Hani's radio edit)
 "To the Moon and Back" (Hani's Num club mix)
 "To the Moon and Back" (Num dub)
 "To the Moon and Back" (Escape into Hyper Space)

Credits and personnel
Credits are adapted from the Savage Garden album booklet.

Studios
 Mixed at Gotham Studios (Melbourne, Australia)
 Mastered at Sony Music Studios (New York City)

Personnel

 Darren Hayes – writing, lead vocals, background vocals, vocal arrangement
 Daniel Jones – writing, additional vocals, additional guitars, keyboards, sequencing, string arrangement
 Rex Goh – guitar
 Alex Hewitson – bass
 Terepai Richmond – drums, percussion
 Jackie Orszaczky – orchestration, conducting
 Charles Fisher – production, vocal arrangement
 Jim Bonnefond – vocal arrangement
 Chris Lord-Alge – mixing
 Vlado Meller – mastering

Charts

Weekly charts

Year-end charts

Certifications

Release history

References

1996 singles
1996 songs
1997 singles
ARIA Award-winning songs
Black-and-white music videos
Columbia Records singles
Music videos directed by Nigel Dick
Number-one singles in Australia
Songs about the Moon
Savage Garden songs
Songs written by Daniel Jones (musician)
Songs written by Darren Hayes
Warner Music Group singles